Mimir is a joint music project started by The Legendary Pink Dots member Edward Ka-Spel and the father of numerous other projects Christoph Heemann. On Mimyriad they were joined by musician and producer Jim O'Rourke, making them something of a left field supergroup. Having similar interests in musical experimentation, specifically in textural music, the two started recording in Heemann's studio. In 1991 their first, self-titled, album came out on the Flabbergast label.  Two of the following albums the group members consider to be more successful in accomplishing the initial goal of making texture-based music. The first two albums have been reissued in remixed/reworked versions on the Streamline label in 2007.

Discography 
 Mimir (2xLP/CD) (1991 Flabbergast)
 Mimyriad (CD/LP) (1993/1999 Streamline)
 Mimir - the untitled 3rd album (LP/CD) (2000/2002 Streamline/Drag City)
 Mimir (7" single) (2005 Brainwashed)
 Mimir (revised) (2007 Streamline/Drag City)
 Mimyriad (revised) (2007 Streamline/Drag City)

Members and contributors 
 Edward Ka-Spel
 Christoph Heemann
 Andreas Martin
 Elke Pueker
 Jim O'Rourke
 The Silverman

External links
 brainwashed.com/mimir - news, discography, biography, sounds, video

Experimental musical groups